Zaporozhsky (masculine), Zaporozhskaya (feminine), or Zaporozhskoye (neuter) is the name of several rural localities in Russia:
Zaporozhskoye, a settlement in Zaporozhskoye Settlement Municipal Formation of Priozersky District in Leningrad Oblast; 
Zaporozhskaya, a stanitsa in Zaporozhsky Rural Okrug of Temryuksky District in Krasnodar Krai;